Budweiser American Ale was an American-style amber ale produced by Anheuser-Busch under its Budweiser brand. Introduced in September 2008, and discontinued in 2011, American Ale was meant to appeal to beer enthusiasts who were looking for a more complex flavor than the popular Budweiser lager. 

It had 5.3% alcohol by volume and was widely available across the United States. A 3.2% alcohol by weight version was available in select states as determined by local laws.

Ingredients 

Budweiser American Ale is an all-malt brew made with caramel malted barley from Idaho and Minnesota, then dry-hopped with Cascade hops from the Pacific Northwest. In addition to using only American ingredients, the beer is also brewed domestically.

Flavor and Appearance 

The ale is often described as amber or copper in color and has sweet, malty and citrus flavors. It is generally described as having a medium-bodied taste with a hoppy finish. 
Recommended serving temperature is 45°F (7°C).

References

External links 

 
 Bud American Ale Finder iPhone Application
 Budweiser American Ale tutorial
 Review of Budweiser's American Ale at Beer is My Poison
 The Brew Site: Budweiser American Ale review

Products introduced in 2008
Anheuser-Busch beer brands